The Young Cinema Award is a film award given at the Venice Film Festival. The motto of the award is "Spirit of time: a look to the present". The jury consists of one hundred 18- to 25-year-olds from different countries, such as France, Canada, Poland, Hungary, and Italy. The 2016 edition gathered French, Tunisian, and Italian young people.

Categories
The award does not have the same categories every year. The following categories are listed below:

Best Italian Film
 2003 – Buongiorno, notte di Marco Bellocchio
 2004 – Nemmeno il destino di Daniele Gaglianone
 2005 – La bestia nel cuore di Cristina Comencini
 2006 – La rieducazione di Amanda Flor
 2007 – Non pensarci di Gianni Zanasi
 2008 – Pranzo di ferragosto di Gianni Di Gregorio 
 2009 – La doppia ora di Giuseppe Capotondi
 2010 – 20 sigarette di Aureliano Amadei
 2011 – L'ultimo terrestre di Gipi
 2012 – La città ideale di Luigi Lo Cascio
 2013 – L'arte della felicità di Alessandro Rak
 2014 – Belluscone - Una storia siciliana di Franco Maresco
 2015 – Pecore in erba di Alberto Caviglia
 2016 – Orecchie di Alessandro Aronadio
 2017 – Beautiful Things di Giorgio Ferrero
 2018 – Capri-Revolution di Mario Martone
 2020 - Notturno di Gianfranco Rosi

Alternatives
 2005 – Lady Vendetta di Park Chan-wook
 2006 – Offscreen di Christoffer Boe
 2007 – Sous les bombes di Philippe Aractingi
 2008 – Sell Out! di Yeo Joon Han

Best Digital Film
 2004 – Un silenzio particolare

Best International Film

References

Italian film awards
Venice Film Festival